Allocreadium is a genus of Trematoda belonging to the family Allocreadiidae.

The genus was first described by Looss in 1900.

The genus has almost cosmopolitan distribution.

Species:
 Allocreadium isoporum (Looss, 1894) Looss, 1900

References

Trematoda